Citharalia is a monotypic moth genus in the family Cossidae described by Harry Kendon Clench in 1957. Its only species, Citharalia idiosetoides, was described by the same author in the same year and is found in Bolivia.

Taxonomy
Research suggests Citharalia does not fit in the Cossidae, and should be excluded from this family. The genus should perhaps be included in the Cossulinae.

References

Cossidae genera
Monotypic moth genera
Moths of South America